Steinheim an der Murr is a town in the district of Ludwigsburg, Baden-Württemberg, Germany. It is situated on the river Murr, 9 km northeast of Ludwigsburg.

It is known worldwide for the Steinheim skull, the skull of an early human found there in 1933.  This human lived around 250,000 years ago. The original skull is kept in the museum of nature in Stuttgart, while in Steinheim, visitors can see two reproductions of the skull in a small museum.

Localities 

 Höpfigheim

Notable people
Notable people born in Steinheim an der Murr include:
 Philipp Christoph Zeller (1808–1883), entomologist (insect collector)
 Eduard Zeller (1814–1908), born in Kleinbottwar, theologian and philosopher

References

Ludwigsburg (district)
Württemberg
Paleoanthropological sites